Trinity Lutheran School (TLS) is a private Lutheran school in Bend, Oregon, United States. It is owned and operated by Trinity Lutheran Church of the Lutheran Church–Missouri Synod. TLS serves approximately 550 students from pre-kindergarten through high school.

History 
Trinity opened in 1959, offering only kindergarten. In 1994 the school moved from the church property at the base of Pilot Butte onto a  parcel on Butler Market Road. Having added pre-school through 5th grade in the original building, the new school building allowed TLS to add grades through grade eight. After completion of a new gymnasium, the church also moved to the property. A donation of modular class buildings allowed TLS to open a high school in 2006. Beginning with only five students, The high school graduated its first class in 2012.

Current demographics 
Total enrollment grades PK-12 hovers around 300 students, averaging 75 students per department (primary, intermediate, middle school, and high school). However, Trinity has seen rapid growth during the 2020–21 school year with enrollment for 2021–22 going over 450 students.

Future plans 
Trinity Lutheran Church has plans to add a new middle school and high school building, and a new sanctuary.

Accreditation 
Trinity Lutheran is fully accredited through both National Lutheran Schools Accreditation and AdvancED,

References

External links

Private middle schools in Oregon
High schools in Deschutes County, Oregon
Christian schools in Oregon
Lutheran schools in Oregon
Educational institutions established in 1959
Education in Bend, Oregon
Private elementary schools in Oregon
Private high schools in Oregon
1959 establishments in Oregon
Schools affiliated with the Lutheran Church–Missouri Synod